The Air Creation iXess is a French double-surface ultralight trike wing, designed and produced by Air Creation of Aubenas. The wing is widely used on Air Creation trikes, as well as those of other manufacturers.

Design and development
The wing is a cable-braced, king post-equipped hang glider-style wing designed as a high performance and competition wing for two-place trikes, although it is also used for flight training.

The wing is made from bolted-together aluminum tubing, with its 90% double surface wing covered in Dacron sailcloth. Its  span wing has a nose angle of 120°, an aspect ratio of 6.66:1 and uses an "A" frame weight-shift control bar.

Originally the top-of-the line wing in Air Creation's catalog, the iXess has lost that position to the Air Creation BioniX, although the iXess remained in production through 2013.

Operational history
The iXess has been widely used in microlight competition and was used to win World Championships in 2001, 2005 and 2007, as well as the European Championships in 2002, 2004 and 2006.

Variants
iXess 13
 version, no longer in production
iXess 15
 version, still in production in 2013

Applications

Air Creation iXess Clipper 582
Air Creation Skypper
Air Creation Tanarg
Air Creation Trek
Apollo Jet Star
Take Off Merlin
Ventura 1200

Specifications (iXess 15)

References

External links

Ultralight trike wings